
Tremorgio Lake is a mountain lake above Rodi and Fiesso, in the municipality of Prato Leventina in the canton of Ticino, Switzerland.

The lake can be reached by aerial cable car from Rodi.

See also
List of lakes of Switzerland
List of mountain lakes of Switzerland
Lepontine Alps

References

External links
Lago Tremorgio visitor information
Laghetti Alpini: Tremorgio e Leit 

Tremorgio
Lepontine Alps